Daniel Chávez (born 13 January 1990 in La Paz) is a Bolivian footballer who plays as a midfielder or winger.

References

External links
 

1990 births
Living people
Footballers from La Paz
Bolivian footballers
Bolivia international footballers
Association football midfielders
La Paz F.C. players
The Strongest players
Club Always Ready players
Bolivian Primera División players